Mauritz Hugo (January 12, 1909 – June 16, 1974) was a Swedish-born American film and television actor.

Selected filmography
 Wanted by the Police (1938)
 Criminal Investigator (1942)
The Crime Smasher (1943)
 Outlaws of Stampede Pass (1943)
 Secrets of a Sorority Girl (1945)
 Black Angel (1946)
 Blonde for a Day (1946)
 Renegades of Sonora (1948)
 Death Valley Gunfighter (1949)
 Search for Danger (1949)
 The Dakota Kid (1951)
 Pistol Harvest  (1951)
 Captive of Billy the Kid (1952)
 Road Agent (1952)
 Yukon Gold (1952)
 Run for the Hills (1953)
 Stagecoach to Dancers' Rock (1962)
 Alvarez Kelly (1966)

References

Bibliography
 Pitts, Michael R. (2012) Western Movies: A Guide to 5,105 Feature Films  (McFarland & Company, Inc.)

External links
 

1909 births
1974 deaths
Swedish male film actors
Swedish male television actors
American male film actors
American male television actors
Swedish emigrants to the United States
People from Östergötland
20th-century American male actors